Calicium chlorosporum is a crustose lichen that is found growing on trees throughout much of the world.

The lichen has a pale brownish yellow to beige, verrucose, areolate or subimmersed thallus.

The species is found in Africa, North, Central and South America, and in Australasia.

References

chlorosporum
Lichen species
Lichens described in 1891
Lichens of Australia
Lichens of Africa
Lichens of North America
Lichens of Central America
Lichens of South America